Arthur (Art) Peterson is an American politician from Vermont. He is a Republican member of the Vermont House of Representatives.

Career 
He was first elected at the 2020 Vermont House of Representatives election, defeating the Democratic incumbent.

References 

Living people
Republican Party members of the Vermont House of Representatives
Year of birth missing (living people)